European route E3 is a series of roads in France, part of the United Nations International E-road network. It runs from Cherbourg to La Rochelle.

Route 
From Cherbourg to Carentan, it travels along the Route nationale 13. At Carentan, it changes to the Route nationale 174. It then moves onto the autoroute, mainly the A84 (which it joins at Junction 40) until it reaches Saint-Lô at Junction 16. It then  rejoins the RN, mainly Route nationale 136 at Rennes before finally travelling along the Route nationale 137 to its final destination of La Rochelle. It also comes close to the outskirts of Nantes.

Historical trajectory 

The original trajectory of the E3 ran from Lisbon, Portugal to Stockholm, Sweden, and later to Helsinki, Finland. It was a series of existing secondary roads and highways, officially bundled under the name E3 by European decree on 16 September 1950. In 1975 the numbering system of European roads changed drastically. The name E3 was applied to the part from Cherbourg-La Rochelle to Carentan, which was part of the original E3. The name of the historical trajectory lives on in E3 Harelbeke, a cycling race in Belgium.

The route of the old trajectory:

 – Lisbon – Salamanca – Valladolid – Burgos – Vitoria-Gasteiz – San Sebastián

 – San Sebastián – Irún – Biarritz – Bayonne – Bordeaux

 – Bordeaux – Poitiers – Tours – Orléans – Paris

 – Paris – Arras

 – Arras – Lille – Kortrijk – Ghent – Antwerp

 – Antwerp – Turnhout – Eindhoven – Venlo – Duisburg

 – Duisburg – Osnabrück – Bremen

 – Bremen – Hamburg

 – Hamburg – Flensburg – Frøslev – Kolding – Vejle – Aarhus – Aalborg – Frederikshavn – ... – Gothenburg

 – Gothenburg – Stockholm

 – Stockholm – Turku – Helsinki

Detailed route

References

External links 
 UN Economic Commission for Europe: Overall Map of E-road Network (2007)

E0003
03